Fortambek Glacier is a glacier located in the Sangvor District of Tajikistan, located near Peak Ozodi. The glacier is about 27km in length.

Description 
Fortambek Glacier is located in a mountainous region. It is located in a valley. The area has a population density of less than 2 people. It is almost completely covered with ice.

Climate 
The average temperature is -13°C. The warmest month is August, with an average temperature of -3°C and the coldest is January, with an average temperature of -24°C. The average rainfall is 575 millimeters per year. The wettest month is April, with about 91 millimeters of rain, and the driest is September, with about 14 millimeters.

References

Glaciers of Tajikistan